August is the eighth month of the year in the Julian and Gregorian calendars, and the fifth of seven months to have a length of 31 days. Its zodiac sign is Leo and was originally named Sextilis in Latin because it was the 6th month in the original ten-month Roman calendar under Romulus in 753 BC, with March being the first month of the year. About 700 BC, it became the eighth month when January and February were added to the year before March by King Numa Pompilius, who also gave it 29 days. Julius Caesar added two days when he created the Julian calendar in 46 BC (708 AUC), giving it its modern length of 31 days. In 8 BC, it was renamed in honor of Emperor Augustus. According to a Senatus consultum quoted by Macrobius, he chose this month because it was the time of several of his great triumphs, including the conquest of Egypt. Commonly repeated lore has it that August has 31 days because Augustus wanted his month to match the length of Julius Caesar's July, but this is an invention of the 13th century scholar Johannes de Sacrobosco. Sextilis in fact had 31 days before it was renamed, and it was not chosen for its length.

In the Southern Hemisphere, August is the seasonal equivalent of February in the Northern Hemisphere. In the Northern Hemisphere, August falls in the season of summer. In the Southern Hemisphere, the month falls during the season of winter. In many European countries, August is the holiday month for most workers. Numerous religious holidays occurred during August in ancient Rome.

Certain meteor showers take place in August. The Kappa Cygnids take place in August, with the dates varying each year. The Alpha Capricornids meteor shower takes place as early as July 10 and ends at around August 10, and the  Southern Delta Aquariids take  place from mid-July to mid-August, with the peak usually around July 28–29. The Perseids, a major meteor shower, typically takes place between July 17 and August 24, with the days of the peak varying yearly. The star cluster of Messier 30 is best observed around August.

Among the aborigines of the Canary Islands, especially among the Guanches of Tenerife, the month of August received in the name of Beñesmer or Beñesmen, which was also the harvest festival held this month.

August symbols 

   August's birthstones are the peridot, sardonyx, and spinel.
 Its birth flower is the gladiolus or poppy, meaning beauty, strength of character, love, marriage and family.
 The Western zodiac signs for the month of August are Leo (until August 22) and Virgo (from August 23 onwards).

Observances 
This list does not necessarily imply either official status or general observance.

Non-Gregorian observances:  dates 
(All Baha'i, Islamic, and Jewish observances begin at the sundown prior to the date listed, and end at sundown of the date in question unless otherwise noted.)
 List of observances set by the Bahá'í calendar
 List of observances set by the Chinese calendar
 List of observances set by the Hebrew calendar
 List of observances set by the Islamic calendar
 List of observances set by the Solar Hijri calendar

Month-long observances 
 American Adventures Month (celebrating vacationing in the Americas)
 Children's Eye Health and Safety Month
 Digestive Tract Paralysis (DTP) Month
 Get Ready for Kindergarten Month
 Happiness Happens Month
 Month of Philippine Languages or Buwan ng Wika (Philippines)
 Neurosurgery Outreach Month
 Psoriasis Awareness Month
 Spinal Muscular Atrophy Awareness Month
 What Will Be Your Legacy Month

United States month-long observances 
 National Black Business Month
 National Children's Vision and Learning Month
 National Immunization Awareness Month
 National Princess Peach Month
 National Water Quality Month
 National Win with Civility Month

Food Months in the United States 
 National Catfish Month
 National Dippin' Dots Month
 Family Meals Month
 National Goat Cheese Month.
 National Panini Month
 Peach Month
 Sandwich Month

Moveable Gregorian observances 
 National Science Week (Australia)
 See also Movable Western Christian observances
 See also Movable Eastern Christian observances

Second to last Sunday in July and the following two weeks 
 Construction Holiday (Quebec)

1st Saturday 
 Food Day (Canada)
 Mead Day (United States)
 National Mustard Day (United States)

1st Sunday 
 Air Force Day (Ukraine)
 American Family Day (Arizona, United States)
 Children's Day (Uruguay)
 Friendship Day (United States)
 International Forgiveness Day
 Railway Workers' Day (Russia)

First Full week of August 
 National Farmer's Market Week (United States)

1st Monday 
 August Public Holiday (Ireland)
 Children's Day (Tuvalu)
 Civic Holiday (Canada)
 British Columbia Day (British Columbia, Canada)
 Natal Day (Nova Scotia, Canada)
 New Brunswick Day (New Brunswick, Canada)
 Saskatchewan Day (Saskatchewan, Canada
 Terry Fox Day (Manitoba, Canada)
 Commerce Day (Iceland)
 Emancipation Day (Anguilla, Antigua, The Bahamas, British Virgin Islands, Dominica, Grenada, Saint Kitts and Nevis)
 Farmer's Day (Zambia)
 Kadooment Day (Barbados)
 Labor Day (Samoa)
 National Day (Jamaica)
 Picnic Day (Northern Territory, Australia)
 Somers' Day (Bermuda)
 Youth Day (Kiribati)

1st Tuesday 
 National Night Out (United States)

1st Friday 
 International Beer Day

2nd Saturday 
 Sports Day (Russia)

Sunday on or closest to August 9
 National Peacekeepers' Day (Canada)

2nd Sunday 
 Children's Day (Argentina, Chile, Uruguay)
 Father's Day (Brazil, Samoa)
 Melon Day (Turkmenistan)
 Navy Day (Bulgaria)
 National Day (Singapore)

2nd Monday 
 Heroes' Day (Zimbabwe)
 Victory Day (Hawaii and Rhode Island, United States)

2nd Tuesday 
 Defence Forces Day (Zimbabwe)

3rd Saturday 
 National Honey Bee Day (United States)
 Independence Day (India)

3rd Sunday 
 Children's Day (Argentina, Peru)
 Grandparents Day (Hong Kong)

3rd Monday 
 Discovery Day (Yukon, Canada)
 Day of Hearts (Haarlem and Amsterdam, Netherlands)
 National Mourning Day (Bangladesh)

3rd Friday 
 Hawaii Admission Day (Hawaii, United States)

Last Thursday 
 National Burger Day (United Kingdom)

Last Sunday 
 Coal Miner's Day (some former Soviet Union countries)
 National Grandparents Day (Taiwan)

Last Monday 
 Father's Day (South Sudan)
 National Heroes' Day (Philippines)
 Liberation Day (Hong Kong)
 Late Summer Bank Holiday (England, Northern Ireland and Wales)

Fixed Gregorian observances 
 Season of Emancipation (Barbados) (April 14 to August 23)
 International Clown Week (August 1–7)
 World Breastfeeding Week (August 1–7)
 August 1
 Armed Forces Day (China)
 Armed Forces Day (Lebanon)
 Azerbaijani Language and Alphabet Day (Azerbaijan)
 Emancipation Day (Barbados, Guyana, Jamaica, Saint Vincent and the Grenadines, St. Lucia, Trinidad and Tobago, Turks and Caicos Islands)
 Imbolc (Neopaganism, Southern Hemisphere only)
 Lammas (England, Scotland, Neopaganism, Northern Hemisphere only)
 Lughnasadh (Gaels, Ireland, Scotland, Neopaganism, Northern Hemisphere only)
 Minden Day (United Kingdom)
 National Day (Benin)
 National Milkshake Day (United States)
 Official Birthday and Coronation Day of the King of Tonga (Tonga)
 Pachamama Raymi (Quechua people in Ecuador and Peru)
 Parents' Day (Democratic Republic of the Congo)
 Procession of the Cross and the beginning of Dormition Fast (Eastern Orthodoxy)
 Statehood Day (Colorado)
 Swiss National Day (Switzerland)
 Victory Day (Cambodia, Laos, Vietnam)
 World Scout Scarf Day
 Yorkshire Day (Yorkshire, England)
 August 2
 Airmobile Forces Day (Ukraine)
 Day of Azerbaijani cinema (Azerbaijan)
 Our Lady of the Angels Day (Costa Rica)
 Paratroopers Day (Russia)
 Republic Day (North Macedonia)
 August 3
 Anniversary of the Killing of Pidjiguiti (Guinea-Bissau)
 Armed Forces Day (Equatorial Guinea)
 Esther Day (United States)
 Flag Day (Venezuela)
 Independence Day (Niger)
 Arbor Day (Niger)
 National Guard Day (Venezuela)
 National Watermelon Day (United States)
 National White Wine Day (United States)
 August 4
 Coast Guard Day (United States)
 Constitution Day (Cook Islands)
 Matica slovenská Day (Slovakia)
 Revolution Day (Burkina Faso)
 August 5
 Dedication of the Basilica of St Mary Major (Catholic Church)
 Independence Day (Burkina Faso)
 National Underwear Day (United States)
 Victory and Homeland Thanksgiving Day and the Day of Croatian defenders (Croatia)
 August 6
 Feast of the Transfiguration
 Sheikh Zayed bin Sultan Al Nahyan's Accession Day. (United Arab Emirates)
 Hiroshima Peace Memorial Ceremony (Hiroshima, Japan)
 Independence Day (Bolivia)
 Independence Day (Jamaica)
 Russian Railway Troops Day (Russia)
 August 7
 Assyrian Martyrs Day (Assyrian community)
 Battle of Boyacá Day (Colombia)
 Emancipation Day (Saint Kitts and Nevis)
 Independence Day (Ivory Coast)
 Republic Day (Ivory Coast)
 Youth Day (Kiribati)
 August 8
 Ceasefire Day (Iraqi Kurdistan)
 Father's Day (Taiwan)
 Happiness Happens Day (International observance)
 International Cat Day
 Namesday of Queen Silvia of Sweden, (Sweden)
 Nane Nane Day (Tanzania)
 Signal Troops Day (Ukraine)
 August 9
 Battle of Gangut Day (Russia)
 International Day of the World's Indigenous People (United Nations)
 National Day (Singapore)
 National Women's Day (South Africa)
 Remembrance for Radbod, King of the Frisians (The Troth)
 August 10
 Argentine Air Force Day (Argentina)
 Constitution Day (Anguilla)
 Declaration of Independence of Quito (Ecuador)
 International Biodiesel Day
 National S'more Day (United States)
 August 11
 Flag Day (Pakistan)
 Independence Day (Chad)
 Mountain Day (Japan)
 August 12
 Glorious Twelfth (United Kingdom)
 HM the Queen's Birthday and National Mother's Day (Thailand)
 International Youth Day (United Nations)
 Russian Railway Troops Day (Russia)
 Sea Org Day (Scientology)
 World Elephant Day
 August 13
 Independence Day (Central African Republic)
 International Lefthanders Day
 National Filet Mignon Day (United States)
 Women's Day (Tunisia)
 August 14
 Anniversary Day (Tristan da Cunha)
 Commemoration of Wadi al-Dahab (Morocco)
 Day of the Defenders of the Fatherland (Abkhazia)
 Engineer's Day (Dominican Republic)
 Falklands Day (Falkland Islands)
 Independence Day (Pakistan)
 National Creamsicle Day (United States)
 Pramuka Day (Indonesia)
 August 15
 Feast Day of the Assumption of Mary (Catholic holy days of obligation, a public holiday in many countries.
 Ferragosto (Italy)
 Māras (Latvia)
 Mother's Day (Antwerp and Costa Rica)
 National Acadian Day (Acadians)
 Virgin of Candelaria, patron of the Canary Islands. (Tenerife, Spain)
 Feast of the Dormition of the Theotokos (Eastern Orthodox, Oriental Orthodox and Eastern Catholic Churches)
 Navy Day (Romania)
 Armed Forces Day (Poland)**The first day of Flooding of the Nile, or Wafaa El-Nil (Egypt and Coptic Church)
 The main day of Bon Festival (Japan), and its related observances:
 Awa Dance Festival (Tokushima Prefecture)
 Constitution Day (Equatorial Guinea)
 End-of-war Memorial Day, when the National Memorial Service for War Dead is held. (Japan)
 Founding of Asunción (Paraguay)
 Independence Day (Korea)
 Gwangbokjeol (South Korea)
 Jogukhaebangui nal, "Fatherland Liberation Day" (North Korea)
 Independence Day (India)
 Independence Day (Republic of the Congo)
 National Day (Liechtenstein)
 National Mourning Day (Bangladesh)
 Victory over Japan Day (United Kingdom)
 National Lemon Meringue Pie Day (United States)
 August 16
 Bennington Battle Day (Vermont, United States)
 Children's Day (Paraguay)
 Gozan no Okuribi (Kyoto, Japan)
 The first day of the Independence Days (Gabon)
 National Airborne Day (United States)
 National Rum Day (United States)
 Restoration Day (Dominican Republic)
 August 17
 The Birthday of Marcus Garvey (Rastafari)
 Engineer's Day (Colombia)
 Flag Day (Bolivia)
 Independence Day (Indonesia)
 Independence Days (Gabon)
 National Vanilla Custard Day (United States)
 Prekmurje Union Day (Slovenia)
 San Martin Day (Argentina)
 August 18
 Arbor Day (Pakistan)
 Armed Forces Day (North Macedonia)
 Bad Poetry Day
 Birthday of Virginia Dare (Roanoke Island)
 Constitution Day (Indonesia)
 Long Tan Day (Australia)
 National Science Day (Thailand)
 August 19
 Feast of the Transfiguration (Julian calendar), and its related observances:
 Buhe (Ethiopian Orthodox Tewahedo Church)
 Saviour's Transfiguration, popularly known as the "Apples Feast" (Russian Orthodox Church and Georgian Orthodox Church)
 Afghan Independence Day (Afghanistan)
 August Revolution Commemoration Day (Vietnam)
 Birthday of Crown Princess Mette-Marit (Norway)
 Manuel Luis Quezón Day (Quezon City and other places in The Philippines named after Manuel L. Quezon)
 National Aviation Day (United States)
 National Potato Day (United States)
 World Humanitarian Day
 August 20
 Indian Akshay Urja Day (India)
 Restoration of Independence Day (Estonia)
 Revolution of the King and People (Morocco)
 Saint Stephen's Day (Hungary)
 World Mosquito Day
 August 21
 Ninoy Aquino Day (Philippines)
 Youth Day/King Mohammed VI's Birthday (Morocco)
 August 22
 Feast of the Coronation of Mary
 Flag Day (Russia)
 Madras Day (Chennai and Tamil Nadu, India)
 National Eat a Peach Day (United States)
 National Pecan Torte Day (United States)
 Southern Hemisphere Hoodie-Hoo Day (Chase's Calendar of Events, Southern Hemisphere)
 August 23
 Battle of Kursk Day (Russia)
 Day of the National Flag (Ukraine)
 European Day of Remembrance for Victims of Stalinism and Nazism or Black Ribbon Day (European Union and other countries), and related observances:
 Liberation from Fascist Occupation Day (Romania)
 International Day for the Remembrance of the Slave Trade and its Abolition
 Umhlanga Day (Eswatini)
 August 24
 Flag Day (Liberia)
 Independence Day of Ukraine
 International Strange Music Day
 National Waffle Day (United States)
 Nostalgia Night (Uruguay)
 Willka Raymi (Cusco, Peru)
 August 25
 Day of Songun (North Korea)
 Independence Day (Uruguay)
 Liberation Day (France)
 National Banana Split Day (United States)
 National Whiskey Sour Day (United States)
 Soldier's Day (Brazil)
 August 26
 Herero Day (Namibia)
 Heroes' Day (Namibia)
 Repentance Day (Papua New Guinea)
 Women's Equality Day (United States)
 August 27
 Film and Movies Day (Russia)
 Independence Day (Republic of Moldova)
 Lyndon Baines Johnson Day (Texas, United States)
 National Banana Lovers Day (United States)
 National Pots De Creme Day (United States)
 August 28
 Assumption of Mary (Eastern Orthodox Church (Public holiday in North Macedonia, Serbia, and Georgia (country))
 Crackers of the Keyboard Day
 Race Your Mouse Around the Icons Day
 National Cherry Turnover Day (United States)
 August 29
 International Day against Nuclear Tests
 Miners' Day (Ukraine)
 More Herbs, Less Salt Day
 National Lemon Juice Day (United States)
 National Chop Suey Day (United States)
 National Sports Day (India)
 Slovak National Uprising Anniversary (Slovakia)
 Telugu Language Day (India)
 August 30
 Constitution Day (Kazakhstan)
 Constitution Day  (Turks and Caicos Islands)
 Independence Day (Tatarstan, Russia, unrecognized)
 International Day of the Disappeared (International)
 Popular Consultation Day (East Timor)
 Saint Rose of Lima's Day (Peru)
 Victory Day (Turkey)
 August 31
 Baloch-Pakhtun Unity Day (Balochs and Pashtuns, International observance)
 Day of Solidarity and Freedom (Poland)
 Independence Day (Federation of Malaya, Malaysia)
 Independence Day (Kyrgyzstan)
 Independence Day (Trinidad and Tobago)
 Love Litigating Lawyers Day
 National Language Day (Moldova)
 National Trail Mix Day (United States)
 North Borneo Self-government Day (Sabah, Borneo)

References

Further reading 

 
08
Augustus